The third season of The Good Wife began airing on September 25, 2011, and concluded on April 29, 2012.

Premise

The series focuses on Alicia Florrick, whose husband Peter, the former Cook County, Illinois State's Attorney, has been jailed following a notorious political corruption and sex scandal. After having spent the previous thirteen years as a stay-at-home mother, Alicia returns to the workforce as a litigator to provide for her two children.

Cast

Main
 Julianna Margulies as Alicia Florrick
 Matt Czuchry as Cary Agos
 Archie Panjabi as Kalinda Sharma
 Makenzie Vega as Grace Florrick
 Graham Phillips as Zach Florrick
 Alan Cumming as Eli Gold
 Josh Charles as Will Gardner
 Christine Baranski as Diane Lockhart

Recurring
 Chris Noth as Peter Florrick
 Monica Raymund as Dana Lodge
 Mary Beth Peil as Jackie Florrick
 Anna Camp as Caitlin D'arcy
 Zach Grenier as David Lee
 Anika Noni Rose as Wendy Scott-Carr
 Michael Boatman as Julius Cain
 Renée Elise Goldsberry as Geneva Pine
 Carrie Preston as Elsbeth Tascioni
 Jerry Adler as Howard Lyman
 Lisa Edelstein as Celeste Serrano
 Michael J. Fox as Louis Canning
 Parker Posey as Vanessa Gold
 Amy Sedaris as Stacie Hall
 Tim Guinee as Andrew Wiley
 Dallas Roberts as Owen Cavanaugh
 Mike Pniewski as Frank Landau
 Dylan Baker as Colin Sweeney
 Jill Flint as Lana Delaney
 Matthew Perry as Mike Kresteva
 Kurt Fuller as Judge Peter Dunaway
 Romany Malco as Justin Coyne
 Michael Kelly as Mickey Gunn

Guest
 Mike Colter as Lemond Bishop
 Denis O'Hare as Judge Charles Abernathy
 Chris Butler as Matan Brody
 Titus Welliver as Glenn Childs
 Gary Cole as Kurt McVeigh
 Martha Plimpton as Patti Nyholm
 Mamie Gummer as Nancy Crozier
 Rita Wilson as Viola Walsh
 Sarah Steele as Marissa Gold
 John Benjamin Hickey as Neil Gross
 Joe Morton as Daniel Golden
 David Paymer as Judge Richard Cuesta
 Kelli Giddish as Sophia Russo
 Morena Baccarin as Isobel Swift
 Jonathan Groff as Jimmy Fellner

Episodes

Reception

The review aggregator website Rotten Tomatoes reports an approval rating for the season of 95% based on 21 reviews. The website's consensus reads, "Controversial topics make for controversial viewing, but thankfully The Good Wifes strong characters and storytelling are up to the task."

Awards and nominations

Primetime Emmy Awards
Nomination for Outstanding Lead Actress in a Drama Series (Julianna Margulies for "Parenting Made Easy")
Nomination for Outstanding Supporting Actress in a Drama Series (Christine Baranski for "Alienation of Affection")
Nomination for Outstanding Supporting Actress in a Drama Series (Archie Panjabi for "The Dream Team")
Nomination for Outstanding Guest Actor in a Drama Series (Dylan Baker for "Marthas and Caitlins")
Nomination for Outstanding Guest Actor in a Drama Series (Michael J. Fox for "Parenting Made Easy")
Won for Outstanding Guest Actress in a Drama Series (Martha Plimpton for "The Dream Team")
Nomination for Outstanding Casting for a Drama Series (Mark Saks)

Ratings

References

2011 American television seasons
2012 American television seasons
3